Draga Stamejčič (27 February 1937 – August 2015) was a Slovenian athlete who competed at the 1960 and 1964 Olympics. In 1960 she was eliminated in the heats of the 80 m hurdles event. Two weeks before the 1964 Games she set a world record in the hurdles, but at the Olympics finished only seventh due to a knee injury. She also finished fifth in the pentathlon. The knee injury required an extensive operation and resulted in her retirement around mid-1960s. She married, gave birth to twins and devoted herself to the family. In 2012, she was inducted into the Slovenian Athletes Hall of Fame.

References

1937 births
2015 deaths
Slovenian female hurdlers
Yugoslav pentathletes
Yugoslav female hurdlers
Olympic athletes of Yugoslavia
Athletes (track and field) at the 1960 Summer Olympics
Athletes (track and field) at the 1964 Summer Olympics
World record setters in athletics (track and field)
Sportspeople from Ljubljana